Founded in 2008 by Jae Choi, the Collective Shift is a boutique agency representing a unique class of artists spanning disciplines as varied as fashion photography, film, art, movement, illustration and animation, fashion design and art direction. They focus on working with clients to create the most compelling and contemporary content possible.

Artists represented by The Collective Shift
 Ashley Helvey
 Baque Creative
 Casey Spooner
 Gillian Garcia
 Luis Venegas
 Nan Goldin
 Penny Martin
 PlayLab, Inc.
 Stephen Galloway
 Tim Elkaïm
 Tom Ordoyno
 Tommy Ton
 Veronica Ditting
 Vicki King

References

External links 
 theCollectiveShift Website
 theCollectiveShift Instagram
 theCollectiveShift Facebook
 theCollectiveShift Twitter

Talent agencies
Privately held companies based in New York (state)